Terrance Bernard Jackson (born January 10, 1976) is an American former college and professional football player who was a fullback, running back and special teams player in the National Football League (NFL) for seven seasons during the 1990s and 2000s.  Jackson played college football for the University of Florida, and was a member of a national championship team.  Thereafter, he played professionally for the San Francisco 49ers of the NFL.  Jackson is now a college football administrator at his alma mater.

Early years 

Jackson was born in Gainesville, Florida in 1976.  His father was Willie Jackson, Sr., a former Gators wide receiver who was one of the first two African-American athletes to play for the University of Florida's Gators football team from 1970 to 1973.  Jackson attended P.K. Yonge High School in Gainesville, where he was standout athlete for the P.K. Yonge Blue Wave high school football and basketball teams.  In football, he played a variety of positions including fullback, strong safety, linebacker and tailback.  Jackson's older brother, Willie Jackson, Jr., was an All-American wide receiver for the Florida Gators and played in the NFL.

College career 

Jackson accepted an athletic scholarship to attend the University of Florida in Gainesville, where he played for coach Steve Spurrier's Florida Gators football team from 1995 to 1998.  Despite his versatility and demonstrated athleticism in high school, he was not highly rated by the recruiting services and he received one of the last scholarships offered by the Gators.  Jackson, like his older brother, Willie Jackson, Jr., and his father, Willie Jackson, Sr., before him, wore football jersey number "22" for the Gators.  The Gators coaching staff redshirted him when he was a true freshman in 1994, and he converted from strong safety to tailback to help meet the needs of the team in 1995, and memorably ran for 138 yards and three touchdowns against the Kentucky Wildcats.  During Jackson's four seasons as a letterman, the Gators won Southeastern Conference (SEC) championships in 1995 and 1996, and the Bowl Alliance national championship in 1996.  As a senior in 1998, Jackson was a team captain and a second-team Academic All-American.

Jackson was also as an SEC Academic Honor Roll honoree all four years, and was the recipient of an NCAA post-graduate scholarship.  He graduated from the University of Florida with a bachelor's degree in business administration in 1998.

Professional career 

Jackson was a solid interior runner, and had surprising quickness and power when he broke through the line. He was primarily used as a blocker and receiver out of the backfield on third down situations. Jackson was also a good special teams player and was a team captain of the special teams squad for several years. He had a limited role on offense in his final two NFL seasons.

Life after the NFL 

In March 2008, the Florida Gators' head football coach Urban Meyer announced that Jackson had been hired to serve as the Director of Player and Community Relations for the Gators football staff.

See also 

 Florida Gators football, 1990–99
 History of the San Francisco 49ers
 List of Florida Gators in the NFL Draft
 List of University of Florida alumni

References

Bibliography 

 Carlson, Norm, University of Florida Football Vault: The History of the Florida Gators, Whitman Publishing, LLC, Atlanta, Georgia (2007).  .
 Golenbock, Peter, Go Gators!  An Oral History of Florida's Pursuit of Gridiron Glory, Legends Publishing, LLC, St. Petersburg, Florida (2002).  .
 Hairston, Jack, Tales from the Gator Swamp: A Collection of the Greatest Gator Stories Ever Told, Sports Publishing, LLC, Champaign, Illinois (2002).  .
 McCarthy, Kevin M.,  Fightin' Gators: A History of University of Florida Football, Arcadia Publishing, Mount Pleasant, South Carolina (2000).  .
 Nash, Noel, ed., The Gainesville Sun Presents The Greatest Moments in Florida Gators Football, Sports Publishing, Inc., Champaign, Illinois (1998).  .

1976 births
Living people
American football running backs
Florida Gators football players
San Francisco 49ers players
Players of American football from Gainesville, Florida